On Tuesday, June 2, 1998, one of the most significant tornado outbreaks in recent history hit the east-central United States. The severe weather event spawned a total of 33 tornadoes in nine states from New York to South Carolina and caused an estimated $40 million in damage, 77 injuries and 2 fatalities. For Pennsylvania in particular, it was the second historic and deadly severe weather outbreak in three days, as it immediately followed the late-May 1998 tornado outbreak and derecho.

Background
On June 2, the Storm Prediction Center outlined a Moderate risk of severe weather across a large portion of the Mid-Atlantic and Northeastern United States regions, allowing a series of shortwave troughs to undercut the vortex across the northern half of the country. Combined with a very unstable atmosphere, exhibited by convective available potential energy values forecast above 3,000 J/kg, forecasters remarked on the potentially for a classic northwest flow event. Into the afternoon hours, a main shortwave accompanied by 500 mb winds up to  pushed toward Lake Michigan. This feature enhanced a low-level convergence zone and surface barometric pressure falls associated with a lee trough east of the Appalachian Mountains, and generally contributed to widespread favorable wind profiles conducive for supercells. Given forecast storm relative helicity values of 300–600 m2/s2, the possibility of isolated significant, F2 or stronger on the Fujita scale, tornadoes were possible. Storms first developed across portions of Ontario southward into Ohio, and scattered supercells evolved across southern New York, Pennsylvania, the Delmarva region, and North Carolina over subsequent hours as the cold front continued eastward. This activity ultimately weakened as it encountered a loss of daytime heating and moisture closer to the coastline with the Atlantic Ocean.

Confirmed tornadoes

Frostburg, Maryland

The most significant tornado of the outbreak was a violent F4 tornado that tracked across Pennsylvania and Maryland during the evening hours of June 2. The tornado first touched down at 9:00 p.m. EDT (01:00 UTC) in extreme eastern Fayette County, Pennsylvania, where it only sheared or uprooted trees. Though the tornado moved across generally rural areas, it still encountered many farms which were completely demolished. A manufactured home was blown off its foundation. In conjunction with other tornadoes in the county that afternoon, about 30 to 40 properties sustained some form of damage. Over 100 heads of cattle were killed in one destroyed barn alone, and many other farms suffered the loss of dozens of livestock too. The tornado crossed into Garrett County, Maryland, now at F2 strength. It destroyed several buildings as it moved through the town of Finzel, including a small house and a cinder-block garage. It descended Big Savage Mountain and entered Frostburg. In this area, at least eight homes were destroyed, including a two-story house that was obliterated. Dozens of other houses were damaged. An equal number of cars were damaged, some of which were totaled. Additional damage was incurred to structures in Eckhart Mines and Clarysville before the tornado crossed Dans Mountain. It continued north of Cresaptown before lifting. Approximately 29 houses were destroyed and another 125 were damaged along the tornado's path, and about half of the homes remaining nevertheless suffered moderate to major damage. Thousands of trees were snapped or uprooted. Initial monetary cost from the tornado ranged from $4.5–5 million (1998 USD). Five people were injured. It is one of three violent F4 tornadoes on record in Maryland, with the other two occurring in 1926 and 2002.

Lake Carey, Pennsylvania

A tornado first began over the southeastern portions of Bradford County, Pennsylvania, in Terry Township. An adjacent farm vehicle, pickup truck, and storage shed stopped the structure from rolling down a nearby steep hill. A storage building was severely damaged near this location, with its roof completely ripped off and some of its metal beams removed from the siding. The tornadic funnel ascended to the tree top level for a time but descended once more as it flattened a large barn. A newly bult home with a large rear deck suffered only minor damage in this vicinity. The tornado continued into Wyoming County and affected structures along a small hill, causing minor damage to their siding and roofs. As it crossed Lake Carey and impacted surrounding structures, it reached F3 intensity. Every structure along a narrow strip of land across Lake Carey was either severely damaged or completely flattened. At one house, an elderly woman and her grandson were sucked out of their second story home, resulting in their deaths. The tornado continued up another hill east of the lake and continued to inflict significant damage to homes. One of the houses was reduced to its bare foundation and a portion of its back wall In total, 42 homes around this area were significantly damaged or demolished. Over a dozen small and anchored boats were tossed out of the water and onto the shoreline. The tornado continued into East Lemon Township, heavily damaged three houses. One of the houses had its roof ripped off and its garage destroyed, while a second had its back deck destroyed and all of its back windows blown out. One injury occurred in the township. The tornado moved into Lackawanna County, where it struck the campus of Keystone Junior College, blowing out windows and twisting gutters. After , the tornado finally lifted in North Abington Township.

See also
List of North American tornadoes and tornado outbreaks
Late-May 1998 tornado outbreak and derecho
1944 Appalachians tornado outbreak
1991 West Virginia derecho
2001 Maryland, Virginia, and Washington, D.C. tornado outbreak
June 2012 North American derecho

Notes

References

Tornadoes of 1998
Tornadoes in Pennsylvania
Tornadoes in West Virginia
Tornadoes in Maryland
Tornadoes in New York (state)
Tornadoes in Tennessee
Tornadoes in Virginia
Tornadoes in North Carolina
Tornadoes in Ohio
Tornadoes in South Carolina
1998 natural disasters in the United States
June 1998 events in the United States